In enzymology, a dihydrolipoyllysine-residue succinyltransferase is an enzyme that catalyzes the chemical reaction

succinyl-CoA + enzyme N6-(dihydrolipoyl)lysine  CoA + enzyme N6-(S-succinyldihydrolipoyl)lysine

Thus, the two substrates of this enzyme are succinyl-CoA and enzyme N6-(dihydrolipoyl)lysine, whereas its two products are CoA and enzyme N6-(S-succinyldihydrolipoyl)lysine.

This enzyme belongs to the family of transferases, specifically those acyltransferases transferring groups other than aminoacyl groups.  The systematic name of this enzyme class is succinyl-CoA:enzyme-N6-(dihydrolipoyl)lysine S-succinyltransferase. Other names in common use include dihydrolipoamide S-succinyltransferase, dihydrolipoamide succinyltransferase, dihydrolipoic transsuccinylase, dihydrolipolyl transsuccinylase, dihydrolipoyl transsuccinylase, lipoate succinyltransferase (Escherichia coli), lipoic transsuccinylase, lipoyl transsuccinylase, succinyl-CoA:dihydrolipoamide S-succinyltransferase, succinyl-CoA:dihydrolipoate S-succinyltransferase, and enzyme-dihydrolipoyllysine:succinyl-CoA S-succinyltransferase.  This enzyme participates in citrate cycle (tca cycle) and lysine degradation.

Structural studies

References

 
 Boyer, P.D. (Ed.), The Enzymes, 3rd ed., vol. 1, Academic Press, New York, 1970, p. 213-240.
 
 

EC 2.3.1
Enzymes of known structure